The Indian lizardfish (Synodus indicus)  is a species of lizardfish that lives mainly in the Indo-West Pacific Ocean.

Environment
This species is native to a tropical climate. They are found in areas of sandy or muddy bottoms of waters that are prone to currents. This species is known to bury itself in the sand.

Size

Commercial
S. indicus is sold both fresh and dried and salted in markets. This species is bred in fisheries for human commercial uses.

Distribution
S. indicus is recorded to be found in the areas of the Indo-West Pacific, southern Red Sea,  East Africa, southern India,  and Sri Lanka. One specimen was found in the Philippines. This species was also reported to be found in Indonesia and northwestern Australia.

Threats
S. indicus is not a threat to humans.

References

Further reading
 

Synodontidae
Fish described in 1873